"Big for Your Boots" is a song by English rapper Stormzy. It was released as the lead single from his debut studio album, Gang Signs & Prayer, on 3 February 2017, by #Merky Records. The song was written by Stormzy and produced by Sir Spyro and Fraser T. Smith. It peaked at number six on the UK Singles Chart, becoming Stormzy's highest-charting single at the time of its release.

Music video
The accompanying music video, directed by Daps, was released on YouTube on 3 February 2017.

Chart performance
On 10 February 2017, the song entered the UK Singles Chart at number eight, and later peaked at number six.

Charts

Weekly charts

Year-end charts

Certifications

Release history

References 

2017 singles
Stormzy songs
2017 songs
2018 singles
Song recordings produced by Fraser T. Smith
Songs written by Stormzy
Warner Music Group singles